Rivanna may refer to:

Places in Virginia
Rivanna, Virginia, a census-designated place in Albemarle County
Rivanna, Virginia (unincorporated community), an unincorporated community in Albemarle County
Rivanna Farm, a farm near Bremo Bluff, Virginia
Rivanna River, a tributary of the James River
Rivanna Subdivision Trestle, a trestle in Richmond, Virginia

Other uses
Rivanna Junction, a 2006 album by Tim Barry